The Professional Commons is an independent, membership-based, non-profit organisation and public policy think tank established in Hong Kong on 25 March 2007. It is open to all professionals who share the same values.

Mission
The Professional Commons aims at improving the quality of public governance and empowering the community in the policy-making process by harnessing the soft power of responsible professionalism. The Professional Commons' missions are:
 To achieve equal and universal suffrage;
 To monitor government through professional analysis;
 To engage with the community in developing public policies;
 To express professional views in the pursuit of public interest; and
 To uphold core values of professional independence, freedom and integrity.
The Professional Commons vow to work to promote matters of significant public interest rather than those of sectoral or trade interests.

History
During the Chief Executive election in March 2007, over 100 Election Committee (EC) members from various professional sectors joined hands to advocate a faster pace for democracy. Many of these EC members, together with like-minded professionals, decided afterwards to build on this foundation as an agent for democratisation and good governance.

In the 2012 LegCo election, three Professional Commons members were elected to the legislature including Charles Mok in the Information Technology functional constituency (FC), Kenneth Leung in the Accountancy FC, and Dennis Kwok, who ran as a Civic Party candidate, in the Legal FC.

Structure
It adopts a network-based governance model and organisational matters are handled by three committees elected from among the members: the Strategy Committee, Management Committee and Communications Committee.

Issue task group
Members may at any time, subject to the approval of the Strategy Committee, set up an issue task group provided at least 4 members from at least 3 professional sectors have expressed interest to play an active role. All task groups are open to all members. A convenor and a co-convenor, who shall serve as the link with the Strategy Committee, shall be elected from among the members of the relevant task groups.

Leadership

Chairmen
 Charles Mok
 Kenneth Leung
 Stanley Ng
 Paul Zimmerman

Performance in elections

Legislative council elections

See also
 List of think tanks in Hong Kong

References

2007 establishments in Hong Kong
Liberal parties in Hong Kong
Non-profit organisations based in Hong Kong
Political and economic think tanks based in Hong Kong
Pro-democracy camp (Hong Kong)
Think tanks established in 2007